F-box protein 16 is a protein that in humans is encoded by the FBXO16 gene.

Function

This gene encodes a member of the F-box protein family, members of which are characterized by an approximately 40 amino acid motif, the F-box. The F-box proteins constitute one of the four subunits of ubiquitin protein ligase complex called SCFs (SKP1-cullin-F-box), which function in phosphorylation-dependent ubiquitination. The F-box proteins are divided into three classes: Fbws containing WD-40 domains, Fbls containing leucine-rich repeats, and Fbxs containing either different protein-protein interaction modules or no recognizable motifs. The protein encoded by this gene belongs to the Fbx class. Multiple transcript variants encoding different isoforms have been found for this gene.

References

Further reading